The Chicago Film Critics Association Award for Best Original Score is one of several categories presented by the Chicago Film Critics Association (CFCA), an association of professional film critics, who work in print, broadcast and online media, based in Chicago. Since the 6th Chicago Film Critics Association Awards (1993), the award has been presented annually. The nominations from 1993, 1994 and 2004 are not available. The first Chicago Film Critics Association Award for Best Original Score went to composer Michael Nyman for his score to The Piano. The most recent recipient of this award is Justin Hurwitz for the black comedy-drama film Babylon.

French film composer Alexandre Desplat has the most nominations (13), with one win. Howard Shore and Jonny Greenwood have the most wins (three) from six nominations. Hans Zimmer has ten nominations, which have resulted in one win. English musician Clint Mansell has two wins from two nominations, as does Mica Levi. Carter Burwell has one win from five nominations. Other notable achievers are James Horner, Randy Newman, and Trent Reznor and Atticus Ross who all have one win from four nominations. Several composers have been nominated multiple times, but never received the award, including Danny Elfman, Philip Glass and Elliot Goldenthal.

The 12th Chicago Film Critics Association Awards (1999) saw the first two female composers, Jocelyn Pook and Rachel Portman, nominated for the award. In 2007, Markéta Irglová became the first female musician to win the award, along with Glen Hansard, for their work on Once. James Newton Howard became the first composer to receive multiple nominations at the 18th Chicago Film Critics Association Awards. He was nominated for his work on King Kong and his collaboration with Zimmer on Batman Begins. At the 25th Chicago Film Critics Association Awards (2012), Desplat received nominations for his scores to Argo, Moonrise Kingdom and Zero Dark Thirty, the first time a composer has been nominated three times in one year.

Winners and nominees

1990s

2000s

2010s

2020s

See also

References
General

 
 

Specific

Chicago Film Critics Association Awards
Film awards for best score
Awards established in 1993